MECP may refer to

Mobile Electronic Certified Professional, a certification available in the United States
Myanmar Eye Care Project, a not-for-profit organisation
MECP2, a gene
MECP2 duplication syndrome, a rare disease linked to the gene
Methylcyclopentadiene, a chemical compound also known as MeCp
Master Emergency Control Panel